Sir Robert Williames Vaughan, 2nd Baronet (29 March 176822 April 1843) was a Welsh landowner and Tory politician who sat in the House of Commons for 40 years from 1792 to 1836.

Nannau house

In 1800, Robert Vaughan embarked on a life long journey to redesign his home and neighbouring areas. He lavishly rebuilt the Georgian home of Nannau, and designed the surrounding estate; he completed the job with the help from Joseph Bromfield, who created a pavilion wing and some internal features after a fire in 1808. 
He took inspiration from an architectural book written by Peter Frederick Robinson, but added subtle alterations to the designs inspired by Tudor architecture.

Estate

All around the 10,164 acre estate and Llanfachreth village 55 miles of walling was built, for such a task he kept 18 horses and mules, with 9 men operating carts (carters). Two farms and ten cottages were built on the estate. Then five arches and one lodge were constructed between 1820-30, and another lodge named after his ancestor Hywel Sele, and a deer park, miles more of carriage driveways and a fishing pond too. He also turned his attention to Dolgellau by rebuilding the town centre.

On the estate of Nannau were several famous things including one placed there by Sir Robert Vaughan, the 'Nannau bucket' a late Bronze Age urn discovered in nearby Arthog. Vaughan had an interest in antiquarianism and collected such items. Also on the estate was the Nannau Oak which was felled in a summer lightning storm in 1813, the tree famous for being the deathbed of his ancestor Hywel Sele, named 'Derwen Ceubren yr Ellyll'. The oak was subsequently used for various things such as a stirrup cup during his only son's 21st birthday, which is still considered one of Wales' grandest birthdays. During 1824, the famous white Nannau Ox, the last of its herd, was slaughtered for the coming-of-age celebrations at Nannau.

Politician
Vaughan was elected MP for Merioneth in 1792, holding the seat continuously through 14 Parliaments until he was forced to retire in 1836. He also continued to work with Oxford university, he chaired a meeting for gentlemen in Wales who studied at Jesus college like he had, until at least 1819. He was appointed High Sheriff of Merionethshire for 1837–38.

Family and personal life
Vaughan was the eldest son of Sir Robert Howell Vaughan, 1st Baronet, of Hengwrt, Merionethshire who died a year after being created baronet; Robert Vaughan 2nd baronet was educated at Jesus College, Oxford (1787). He succeeded his father on 13 October 1792, his father was buried at St Illtyd's Church, Llanhilleth. Sir Robert inherited the 12,000 acre Nannau estate and farms, as well as Ystum Colwyn, Meillionydd; and the Hengwrt estate, whilst his brother who changed his name to Edward Salesbury inherited the Rhug estate. His brother Edward pursued a career in the military, rising to Colonel of the 1st Regiment of Foot Guards, before his death in battle in 1807, therefore his younger brother Griffith inherited Rhug.

He married Anna Maria, the daughter of Sir Roger Mostyn, 5th Baronet, of Mostyn, Flintshire and Gloddaeth, Caernarvonshire on 23 September 1802.

Before he died he had to settle the family finances, there was the lavish expense amounted from his son's coming of age party, but worse so were his brother's debts which he had to take care of after his death, these in 1842 amounted to £250,000. Sir Robert Williames Vaughan died in April, 1843. He left his estates at Nannau, Hengwrt, Meillionydd and Ystumcolwyn to his son, the 3rd and final of the Vaughan baronets, this was the last time they would be in the common ownership of one person.

References

Books cited

External links

1768 births
1843 deaths
Baronets in the Baronetage of Great Britain
Members of the Parliament of Great Britain for Welsh constituencies
British MPs 1790–1796
British MPs 1796–1800
Members of the Parliament of the United Kingdom for Welsh constituencies
UK MPs 1801–1802
UK MPs 1802–1806
UK MPs 1806–1807
UK MPs 1807–1812
UK MPs 1812–1818
UK MPs 1818–1820
UK MPs 1820–1826
UK MPs 1826–1830
UK MPs 1830–1831
UK MPs 1831–1832
UK MPs 1832–1835
UK MPs 1835–1837
High Sheriffs of Merionethshire
Welsh landowners
Tory MPs (pre-1834)
People from Dolgellau